The Atlantic lizardfish (Synodus saurus), is a species of lizardfish that primarily lives in the Eastern Atlantic.

Information
The Atlantic lizardfish is known to be found in a marine environment within a general demersal depth range of about 400 meters. They are more specifically found in a depth range of about 20 meters. This species is native to a subtropical climate. The maximum recorded length of the Atlantic lizardfish as an unsexed male is about 40 centimeters or about 15.74 inches. The distribution of this species occupies the areas of Eastern Atlantic, Morocco, Cape Verde, Azores, Mediterranean, Western Atlantic, Bermuda, Bahamas, Lesser Antilles, and the Leeward Islands. This species is mainly known to be found in insular waters and on top of sandy or sand-rock bottoms. The diet of the Atlantic lizardfish mainly includes other species of fish, but it is known to also feed occasionally on other animals. The Atlantic lizardfish can be found occupying waters around islands. The Atlantic lizardfish keeps itself hidden and camouflaged by burrowing itself in the sand. While it is burrowed in the sand, this species reveals its eyes so that it can watch its prey and pounce when food is available.

Distribution
The distribution of the Atlantic lizardfish includes all of the following countries:
Albania
Algeria
Anguilla
Antigua 
Barbuda
Bahamas
Barbados;
Bermuda
Bosnia 
Herzegovina
Cape Verde
Croatia
Cyprus
Dominica
Egypt
France
Gibraltar
Greece
Grenada
Guadeloupe
Guinea
Israel
Italy
Lebanon
Libya
Malta
Martinique
Monaco
Montserrat
Morocco
Saint Kitts 
Nevis
Saint Lucia
Saint Vincent
Grenadines
Slovenia
Spain
Syrian Arab Republic
Trinidad
Tobago
Tunisia
Turkey
Virgin Islands
British
Virgin Islands
United States

References

Notes

External links
 

Synodontidae
Fish described in 1758
Taxa named by Carl Linnaeus